In geometry, the equal incircles theorem derives from a Japanese Sangaku, and pertains to the following construction: a series of rays are drawn from a given point to a given line such that the inscribed circles of the triangles formed by adjacent rays and the base line are equal. In the illustration the equal blue circles define the spacing between the rays, as described.

The theorem states that the incircles of the triangles formed (starting from any given ray) by every other ray, every third ray, etc. and the base line are also equal.  The case of every other ray is illustrated above by the green circles, which are all equal.

From the fact that the theorem does not depend on the angle of the initial ray, it can be seen that the theorem properly belongs to analysis, rather than geometry, and must relate to a continuous scaling function which defines the spacing of the rays. In fact, this function is the hyperbolic sine.

The theorem is a direct corollary of the following lemma:

Suppose that the nth ray makes an angle  with the normal to the baseline.

Proof of the lemma 

Line QXOY is parallel to the baseline and passes through O, the center of the incircle of  PST, which is tangent to the rays at W and Z. Also, line PQ has length , and line QR has length , the radius of the incircle.

Then  OWX is similar to  PQX and  OZY is similar to  PQY, and from XY = XO + OY we get

 

This relation on a set of angles, expresses the condition of equal incircles.

To prove the lemma, we set , which gives .

 

With this definition of  we then obtain an expression for the radii, of the incircles formed by taking every Nth ray as the sides of the triangles

See also 
Hyperbolic function
Japanese theorem for cyclic polygons
Japanese theorem for cyclic quadrilaterals
 Tangent lines to circles

References 
Equal Incircles Theorem at cut-the-knot
J. Tabov. A note on the five-circle theorem. Mathematics Magazine 63 (1989), 2, 92–94.

Euclidean geometry
Japanese mathematics
Theorems about triangles and circles